Handball Club Teramo 2002, a.k.a. D'Archivio Arche-Artro Teramo for sponsorship reasons, is an Italian women's handball club from Teramo established in 2002. In 2005 it made its debut in EHF competitions, and in 2012 it won the Italian league for the first time.

Titles
 Serie A1
 2012

References

Sport in Abruzzo
Italian handball clubs

it:HC Teramo 2002